Central Street Historic District may refer to:

Central Street District, Andover, Massachusetts, listed on the NRHP in Massachusetts
Central Street Historic District (Millville, Massachusetts), listed on the NRHP in Massachusetts 
Central Street Historic District (Narragansett, Rhode Island), listed on the NRHP in Rhode Island